Operation Winter may refer to:

 Operation Winter (1920), joint Polish and Latvian operation against the Red Army, culminating in the Battle of Daugavpils
 Operation Winter (South Africa), an effort made by the South African Defence Force to recruit white members of Rhodesian counter-insurgency units following the country's transition to Zimbabwe in 1980
 Operation Winter '94, battle of the Bosnian War and the Croatian War of Independence